Flakpanzer IV is the general designation for a series of self-propelled anti-aircraft guns based on the Panzerkampfwagen IV chassis. They are, in order of development:

Möbelwagen
Wirbelwind
Ostwind
Kugelblitz

World War II self-propelled anti-aircraft weapons of Germany